Malek Baghi (also Romanized as Malek Bāghī; also known as Malik Poweh) is a village in Khenejin Rural District, in the Central District of Komijan County, Markazi Province, Iran. At the 2006 census, its population was 31, in 8 families.

References 

Populated places in Komijan County